The 1932 World Table Tennis Championships women's doubles was the fifth edition of the women's doubles championship.
Mária Mednyánszky and Anna Sipos defeated Marie Šmídová and Anna Braunová in the final by three sets to nil.

Results

See also
 List of World Table Tennis Championships medalists

References

-
-